Jollification is an album by The Lightning Seeds

Jollification may also refer to:
Enjoyment
Jollification, Missouri	
"Jollification", song by The Viceroys from compilation The Viceroys at Studio One: Ya Ho 1995
"Jollification", track from Saving Mr. Banks OST album